The Mystery of the Mary Celeste is a 1935 British mystery film directed by Denison Clift and starring Béla Lugosi, Shirley Grey and Arthur Margetson. It is one of the early films from Hammer Film Productions.

It is based on the story of the Mary Celeste, a sailing ship that was found adrift and deserted in the Atlantic Ocean in 1872, and is an imagined explanation of the disappearance of the crew and passengers.

The version released in the United States, under the title Phantom Ship, is about eighteen minutes shorter than the original. It is believed that only the shortened version survives.

Plot summary 
Captain Briggs (Arthur Margetson) and Captain Morehead (Clifford McLaglen) are best friends. Capt. Morehead is in love with Sarah (Shirley Grey). He brings Briggs to New York to meet her. Briggs himself falls in love with her. Sarah also falls in love with Briggs. Both men propose to her the same day. Sarah chooses Briggs. Sarah and Briggs open their marriage plans to Morehead and he gets furious with jealousy. He's also mad with Briggs for going behind his back. But Briggs tells him that he will marry Sarah even if that means the end of their friendship.

As the couple plans to sail, the husband, Briggs, is short on crew. He asks Morehead to forgive him and help. Morehead agrees and sends a man, Volkerk Grot (Herbert Cameron), not to help, but to do something to the ship.
Briggs also recruits some other men, including Anton Lorenzen (Béla Lugosi) who is a sailor who has suffered a lot and is about to break down.

As the sail begins, the crew realizes that there is a murderer among them who is killing them off one by one. Meanwhile, a crewmember tries to rape Sarah, but Lorenzen saves her by killing the man. But then he cries because he can't stand the pain of killing a man.

Soon, everybody has died or disappeared except 1st mate Bilson, Lorenzen and a third crewmember, Ponta Katz (Gunner Moir). They decide that one of them is a killer.

Katz realizes that Lorenzen could not kill, he was too soft, so he runs after Bilson. Bilson shoots Katz and then celebrates with Lorenzen on becoming the new captain of ship, making plans for future.

Lorenzen gets mad and tells Bilson that it is he who was shanghaied 6 years before, on the same ship. And he was doing all this to get revenge. Then he shoots Bilson and throws him into the sea. Just after killing Bilson, Lorenzen is hit on the head by the boom. He runs everywhere on ship in hope of finding Bilson, and in his madness, he jumps off the ship.

The ship drifts with the wind until it is spotted by another ship. The ship is totally abandoned except for a black cat.

A final scene shows Morehead handing money to his man Grot, commenting "I am thinking of Briggs and her, dead!"

Cast

References

External links 

1935 films
1930s historical films
British historical films
British mystery films
British black-and-white films
Films directed by Denison Clift
British films set in New York City
Hammer Film Productions films
Seafaring films based on actual events
1930s mystery films
Mary Celeste
1930s English-language films
1930s British films